Hewson is a surname. Notable people with the surname include:
 Ali Hewson (born 1961), activist and wife of U2's Bono
 Allan Hewson (born 1954), former New Zealand Rugby union All Black
 Arthur Hewson (1914–1999), Australian politician
 Ashleigh Hewson (born 1979), Australian Rugby union Wallaroo
 Brian Hewson (born 1939), retired British middle-distance athlete
 David Hewson (born 1953), British novelist
 Dave Hewson (composer) (born 1953), British television and film composer
 David Hewson (Canadian football) (born 1982), Canadian footballer
 Dominic Hewson (born 1974), English cricketer
 Emily Hewson (born 1982), Australian tennis player
 Eve Hewson (born 1991), Irish actress and Bono and Ali Hewson's daughter
 Gilbert Hewson (died 1951), Irish politician
 Henry Hewson, rugby league footballer of the 1920s
 John Hewson (died 1662), a soldier in the New Model Army and signatory on the death warrant of King Charles I
 John Hewson (1744–1821), an American textile printer born in England
 John Hewson (born 1946), Australian economist and former politician
 Jones Hewson (1874–1902), Welsh singer and actor
 Liv Hewson (born 1995), Australian actress
 Marillyn Hewson (born 1954), American businesswoman, current Chairman, President, and CEO of Lockheed Martin
 Bono (born Paul Hewson in 1960), Irish singer of U2
 Peter Hewson, British singer, vocalist with Chicory Tip
 Richard Anthony Hewson (born 1943), English musician
 Sam Hewson (born 1988), English footballer
 Sherrie Hewson (born 1950), English actress
 Tony Hewson (born 1934), former British racing cyclist
 William Hewson (1806–1870), English theological writer
 William Hewson (surgeon) (1739–1774), English surgeon

See also
 Hewson River New Zealand
 Hewson-Gutting House, a registered historic building in Cincinnati, Ohio
 Hewson Consultants, 1980s video game developer and publisher

English-language surnames
Anglicised Irish-language surnames